The 2022–23 T1 League regular season is the second regular season of T1 League. Participated teams include Kaohsiung Aquas, New Taipei CTBC DEA, Taichung Suns, Tainan TSG GhostHawks, TaiwanBeer HeroBears and Taoyuan Leopards, each team plays against another six times, three at home and three on the road, respectively, leads to 30 matches in total. The regular season started on October 29, 2022 and ended on April 23, 2023. The 2022–23 season opening game, matched by Kaohsiung Aquas and New Taipei CTBC DEA, was played at Xinzhuang Gymnasium.

League table

Head to head

Matches

Matchweek 1 (Opening match)

Matchweek 2

Matchweek 3

Matchweek 4

Matchweek 5

Matchweek 6

Matchweek 7

Matchweek 8

Matchweek 9

Matchweek 10

Matchweek 11

Matchweek 12

Matchweek 13

Matchweek 14

Matchweek 15

Matchweek 16

Matchweek 17

Matchweek 18

Matchweek 19

Matchweek 20

Matchweek 21

Matchweek 22

Matchweek 23

Matchweek 24

Awards

Yearly awards 

All-T1 League First Team:
 
 
 
 
 

All-Defensive First Team:

Statistical awards

MVP of the Month 
MVP of the Month awards were only for local players.

Import of the Month 
Import of the Month awards were only for import players and type-III players.

See also 
 2022–23 Kaohsiung Aquas season
 2022–23 New Taipei CTBC DEA season
 2022–23 Taichung Suns season
 2022–23 Tainan TSG GhostHawks season
 2022–23 TaiwanBeer HeroBears season
 2022–23 Taoyuan Leopards season

Note

References

External links 
 

T1 League regular season games
Regular season
2022 in Taiwanese sport
2023 in Taiwanese sport